PomA is a protein that is part of the stator in Na+ driven bacterial flagella. It has a high degree of homology to MotA, and Rhodobacter sphaeroides MotA can functionally complement a non-motile Vibrio alginolyticus with a non-functional pomA gene.

See also
MotB -  MotA and MotB make the stator
MotA -  MotA and MotB make the stator
PomB -  protein that is part of the stator in Na+ 
Integral membrane protein a type of membrane protein
Archaellum
Cilium
Ciliopathy
Rotating locomotion in living systems
Undulipodium

References

Motor proteins
Bacterial proteins